Hazel Crest is a station on Metra's Metra Electric Line located in Hazel Crest, Illinois. The station consists of an island platform which serves the Metra Electric Line's two tracks. There is a waiting room with a ticket vending machine.

Bus connections
Pace
 356 Harvey/Homewood/Tinley Park

References

External links

Metra stations in Illinois
Former Illinois Central Railroad stations
Railway stations in Cook County, Illinois
Railway stations in the United States opened in 1856